Beatty Creek is a tributary of the Tahltan River in northwest part of the province of British Columbia, Canada. The Tahltan River is one of the main tributaries of the Stikine River.

Beatty Creek's watershed's land cover is classified as 32.3% shrubland, 22.4% conifer forest, 17.8% barren, 15.8% mixed forest, 10.3% herbaceous, and small amounts of other cover.

Beatty Creek is in the traditional territory of the Tahltan people.

Geography
Beatty Creek originates on the slopes of Meszah Peak, the highest peak of the Level Mountain Range, a cluster of bare peaks on the summit of the massive Level Mountain shield volcano, which forms the most voluminous and most persistent eruptive centre in the Northern Cordilleran Volcanic Province. Beatty Creek flows south by Nalachaga Mountain and through a large forested U-shaped valley that was glacially carved into Level Mountain.

Other streams that originate near the source of Beatty Creek include Kakuchuya Creek, Matsatu Creek, Lost Creek, Kaha Creek, Megatushon Creek, and the Little Tuya River, all of which are upper headwater tributaries of the Stikine River and Taku River systems.

As Beatty Creek flows south through Level Mountain and the Nahlin Plateau it collects numerous unnamed tributary streams, some of which also flow through deep valleys carved into Level Mountain.

Ecology
Beatty Creek supports runs of Chinook salmon and other salmonids.

See also
List of British Columbia rivers

References

External links
 
 

Cassiar Land District
Level Mountain
Rivers of British Columbia
Stikine Country
Nahlin Plateau
Tahltan